Judy K. Emmons is a former  Michigan state senator who represented District 33. She is the former chair of the Families, Seniors and Human Services Committee, and former vice-chair of Education.

Michigan House of Representatives
Emmons' first campaign for the Michigan House of Representatives occurred in 2002, running the 70th District. Incumbent state Rep. Gretchen Whitmer chose to run for re-election in the 69th District rather than the 70th after her district was redrawn following the 2000 Census. Emmons ran in the Republican primary against Jon Aylsworth, who has serve on the Greenville City Council. Emmons won the GOP nomination by taking nearly 63 percent of more than 6,700 votes. In the general election, she defeated Democratic nominee Henry Sanchez, taking nearly 66 percent of more than 22,000 votes. She would not face any Republican opposition for the GOP nomination in the 70th District in her two re-election campaigns, running unopposed in 2004 and 2006. In the 2004 general election she faced a re-match with Sanchez, winning re-election by again taking nearly 66 percent of more than 34,000 votes. She defeated 21-year-old Christopher Mahar by taking nearly 64 percent of almost 30,000 votes.

She was not eligible to run for a fourth term as the Michigan Constitution limits state Representatives to three terms.

Michigan Senate
After Rick Snyder won the GOP nomination for governor in August 2010, he stunned political observes by picking then-state Rep. Brian Calley as his choice to be the GOP nominee for lieutenant governor on August 25, 2010.

Just weeks earlier, Calley had won the GOP nomination for the 33rd state Senate district. On September 3, 2010, Emmons was chosen as Calley's replacement by the 33rd District Republican Party Executive Committee, covering Clinton, Ionia, Isabella and Montcalm counties. The committee selected Emmons over Scott Hummel in an 82-37 vote. In the November general election, Emmons defeated Democratic nominee James Hoisington, capturing almost 65 percent of almost 78,000 votes.

Emmons officially filed for a second term on April 17, 2014. She won re-nomination uncontested in August 2014.

On November 4, 2014, Emmons won re-election to the state Senate  defeating former educator and counselor Fred Sprague, taking 57 percent of the vote.

Emmons is prohibited from seeking re-election to the state Senate, as the state Constitution limits Senators to be elected to a maximum of two, four-year terms.

Electoral history

References

External links
 Senator Judy K. Emmons website State of Michigan
 Judy Emmons' Campaign Site

Women state legislators in Michigan
Republican Party Michigan state senators
Republican Party members of the Michigan House of Representatives
Living people
21st-century American politicians
21st-century American women politicians
People from Montcalm County, Michigan
Year of birth missing (living people)